The specious present is the time duration wherein one's perceptions are considered to be in the present. Time perception studies the sense of time, which differs from other senses since time cannot be directly perceived but must be reconstructed by the brain.

Description
The term was coined by E. Robert Kelly, better known under the pseudonym "E. R. Clay".

The concept was further developed by philosopher William James.  James defined the specious present to be "the prototype of all conceived times... the short duration of which we are immediately and incessantly sensible". C. D. Broad in "Scientific Thought" (1930) further elaborated on the concept of the specious present, and considered that the Specious Present may be considered as the temporal equivalent of a sensory datum.

Finally, the claim of what precisely is being affirmed, in affirming the 'existence' of the specious present, is difficult to clarify. Philosophical theories of time do not usually interpret time to be in any unique way a production of human phenomenology, and the claim that we have some faculty by which we are aware of successive states of consciousness is trivially true.

Notes

References

 Andersen, Holly, and Rick Grush, "A brief history of time-consciousness: historical precursors to James and Husserl", To appear in the Journal of the History of Philosophy.
 Le Poidevin, Robin, "The Experience and Perception of Time", The Stanford Encyclopedia of Philosophy (Winter 2004 Edition), Edward N. Zalta (ed.)
 Hodder, A. (1901). The adversaries of the sceptic; or, The specious present, a new inquiry into human knowledge. Chapter II, The Specious Present. London: S. Sonnenschein &. Pages 36 – 56.

Philosophy of mind
Time in life
Perception